Anthony Roberts (born 27 March 1962) is a South African cricketer. He played in six first-class and two List A matches from 1985/86 to 1990/91.

References

External links
 

1962 births
Living people
South African cricketers
Border cricketers
Eastern Province cricketers
Cricketers from Port Elizabeth